Alexander Hood may refer to:
Admiral Alexander Hood, 1st Viscount Bridport (1726–1814), British Royal Navy admiral
Alexander Hood (Royal Navy officer) (1758–1798)
General Alexander Hood, 1st Viscount Bridport (British Army officer) (1814–1904), British soldier and courtier
Alexander Hood (Governor of Bermuda) (1888–1980), army medical officer and Governor of Bermuda
Alexander Hood, 4th Viscount Bridport (born 1948), British investment banker 
Alexander Hood, 5th Duke of Bronté (1854–1937), British courtier
Alexander Fuller-Acland-Hood, 1st Baron St Audries (1853–1917), MP for Wellington
Alex Hood (born 1935), Australian folklorist

See also
Alexander Acland Hood (disambiguation)